Commodore Perry Kemp (born December 31, 1961) is a former American football wide receiver. He began his professional career with the Jacksonville Bulls of the United States Football League. He then played for the Cleveland Browns and Green Bay Packers of the NFL. He played college football at the California University of Pennsylvania.

Pro Football career
Kemp started his pro career with the Jacksonville Bulls of the USFL who were coached by Lindy Infante in 1985. He was on the Dallas Cowboys roster in the 1986 season but did not play. He then followed Infante to the Cleveland Browns in 1987. He then moved with Infante to the Green Bay Packers in 1988.

Statistics

External links
 Kemp's statistics

1961 births
Living people
People from Canonsburg, Pennsylvania
American football wide receivers
California Vulcans football players
Jacksonville Bulls players
Cleveland Browns players
Green Bay Packers players
Players of American football from Pennsylvania
National Football League replacement players
Ed Block Courage Award recipients